True is an American brand of cigarettes, currently owned by Reynolds American and manufactured through its subsidiary  R.J. Reynolds. The brand was created and formerly owned by the Lorillard Tobacco Company.

History
True was introduced in September 1966 by Lorillard in 10 major U.S. markets, with national distribution beginning on November 1, 1966.  The tagline for the new brand was "Shouldn't your brand be True?". The cigarette, when first introduced, was full flavored. It was later available in a reduced tar and nicotine version during the 1970s and 1980s.

True cigarettes, like Parliament cigarettes, have a recessed filter. However, whereas Parliaments have nothing in the recessed space, Trues have a plastic piece (round with a triangle in the middle and radials which extend to the outside) which prevents the top of the cigarette from being broken, torn, or crushed as any other cigarette can.

In 2015, Reynolds American acquired the brand after they bought the Lorillard Tobacco Company.

Advertising

Lorillard made various poster advertisements to promote the True brand as a "low tar, low nicotine" brand.

A few TV adverts were also made to promote the brand in the late 1960s to early 1970s.

Varieties
Filters Kings: Soft Pack, Box
Filters 100s: Soft Pack, Box
Menthol Kings: Soft Pack, Box
Menthol 100s: Soft Pack, Box

See also
Tobacco smoking

References

R. J. Reynolds Tobacco Company brands